Perisserosa guttata, common name the drop-covered cowry, is a species of sea snail, a marine gastropod mollusk in the family Cypraeidae, the cowries.

Subspecies:
Perisserosa guttata guttata (Gmelin, 1791)
Perisserosa guttata surinensis (Raybaudi, 1978)

Shell description

Distribution 
This marine species occurs in the South China Sea; off Japan, the Philippines, Melanesia and Australia (Queensland)

References

 Liu J.Y. [Ruiyu] (ed.). (2008). Checklist of marine biota of China seas. China Science Press. 1267 pp

External links 
 
 Gmelin J.F. (1791). Vermes. In: Gmelin J.F. (Ed.) Caroli a Linnaei Systema Naturae per Regna Tria Naturae, Ed. 13. Tome 1(6). G.E. Beer, Lipsiae
  Iredale, T. (1930). Queensland molluscan notes, No. 2. Memoirs of the Queensland Museum. 10(1): 73-88, pl. 9

Cypraeidae
Gastropods described in 1825
Taxa named by John Edward Gray